Sand anemone may refer to:

Heteractis aurora (Quoy & Gaimard, 1833), also known as the beaded sea anemone and many other names
Heteractis malu (Haddon & Shackleton, 1893), also known as the delicate sea anemone and white sand anemone
Oulactis muscosa (Drayton in Dana, 1846), also known as the speckled anemone
Urticina columbiana Verrill, 1922, also known as the crusty red anemone, columbia sand anemone, and sand-rose anemone

Animal common name disambiguation pages